Mount James Turner is a  mountain summit located in British Columbia, Canada.

Description
Mount James Turner is the fourth-highest peak within Garibaldi Provincial Park. It is part of the Garibaldi Ranges of the Coast Mountains. Precipitation runoff from the peak drains to Billygoat and Chaos creeks which are tributaries of the Lillooet River. Topographic relief is significant as the summit rises over 1,700 meters (5,577 feet) above Billygoat Creek in approximately three kilometers (1.9 mile).

History
The first ascent of Mt. James Turner was made September 12, 1923, by Neal Carter and Charles Townsend. This was two days after they made the first ascent of Wedge Mountain.

The mountain was named by Neal Carter in memory of Rev. James Turner, a pioneer Methodist minister and outstanding figure well known in British Columbia and Yukon who died in 1923.

The name "Mount James Turner" was recommended by the Garibaldi Park Board, and the toponym was officially adopted September 2, 1930, by the Geographical Names Board of Canada.

Climate

Based on the Köppen climate classification, Mount James Turner is located in the marine west coast climate zone of western North Americ. Most weather fronts originate in the Pacific Ocean, and travel east toward the Coast Mountains where they are forced upward by the range (Orographic lift), causing them to drop their moisture in the form of rain or snowfall. As a result, the Coast Mountains experience high precipitation, especially during the winter months in the form of snowfall. Winter temperatures can drop below −20 °C with wind chill factors below −30 °C. This climate supports the Turner, Berna, and Chaos glaciers surrounding the slopes of this mountain.

See also
 
 Geography of British Columbia

References

External links
 Mount James Turner: Weather forecast
 Mount James Turner: Whistlerhiatus.com
 Mount James Turner (photo): Flickr

Garibaldi Ranges
Two-thousanders of British Columbia
Sea-to-Sky Corridor
New Westminster Land District
Coast Mountains